The 1964 Summer Olympics was the first time that Volleyball had been held as an Olympic sport. The sport would feature two medals during this games with the men's and women's indoor teams events. In both tournaments, the format was the same with a single round robin between all of the teams that was competing in the tournament. 

In the men's competition, the Soviet Union took out the gold medal as they won eight out of their nine games with the only loss being in Japan who came third. Finishing behind only on sets difference was Czechoslovakia who had only their single loss against the Soviet Union. In the women's competition, Japan won all five of their games to take the gold medal ahead of the Soviet Union and Poland who claimed silver and bronze respectively.

Medal table

Medal summary

Gallery

References

External links

Official Olympic Report
 Video of the moments of victory and of awarding gold medal in Tokyo Olympics

 
1964 Summer Olympics events
O
1964
International volleyball competitions hosted by Japan